Dozulé is a commune in the Calvados department in the Normandy region in northern France.

Population

The apparitions and the Glorious Cross 

Between 1972 and 1978, Jesus Christ is said to have appeared 49 times in Dozulé to Madeleine Aumont, a mother of five children, in the presence of her parish priest Victor L'Horset and other faithful people, and is believed to have dictated a series of messages, containing teachings and of warnings for all people, according to those who believe in them. Among them is the daily «Prayer of Dozulé». The messages are seen as an annunciation of the return of Christ. The construction of the «Glorious Cross», an illuminated Catholic cross coloured white and blue, 738m tall with arms 123m long, which means with an exact proportion of a ratio of 3 between the vertical and horizontal length, is seen as a sign of it. The followers of the messages of Dozulé believe also that they are the continuation of the Three Secrets of Fátima and that they ask, for the conversion of humanity to avoid a material and spiritual catastrophe.

International relations 
Dozulé is twinned with Leonard Stanley, a village in Gloucestershire, in the United Kingdom.

See also 
 Glorious Cross of Dozulé
 Communes of the Calvados department

External links 

Dozulé - Official website

Communes of Calvados (department)
Calvados communes articles needing translation from French Wikipedia